In chemistry, an electron-withdrawing group (EWG) is a substituent that has some of the following kinetic and thermodynamic implications: 
with regards to electron transfer, electron-withdrawing groups enhance the oxidizing power tendency of the appended species.  Tetracyanoethylene is an oxidant because the alkene is appended to four cyano substituents, which are electron-withdrawing.
with regards to acid-base reactions, acids with electron-withdrawing groups species have low acid dissociation constants.  For EWG's attached to benzene, this effect is described by the Hammett equation, which allows EWGs to be discussed quantitatively.
with regards to nucleophilic substitution reactions, electron-withdrawing groups are susceptible to attack by weak nucleophiles.  For example, compared to chlorobenzene, chlorodinitrobenzene is susceptible to reactions that displace chloride.
electron-withdrawing substituents enhance the Lewis acidity.  Relative to methyl, fluorine is a strong EWG.  It follows that boron trifluoride is a stronger Lewis acid than is trimethylborane.

References

Physical organic chemistry
Chemical bonding